Rocky Simpson may refer to:

Rocky "R. J." Simpson Jr., a Canadian politician who has served in the Legislative Assembly of the Northwest Territories since 2015,
Rocky Simpson Sr., his father, who has served in the Legislative Assembly of the Northwest Territories since 2019.